E97 may refer to:
 European route E97
 King's Indian Defense, Encyclopedia of Chess Openings code
 Hiji Bypass and Ōita Airport Road, route E97 in Japan